Dumoulin is a surname of French origin. People with that name include:

 Brian Dumoulin (b. 1991) - an American ice hockey player
 Charles Dumoulin (1500–1566) - a French jurist
  (1768–1825) - a French general
  (1811–1858) - a French hydrographer
 Cyril Dumoulin (b. 1984) - a French handball player 
  (16??–after 1751) - a French dancer, The Royal Academy of Dance (Paris)
 François Aimé Louis Dumoulin (1753–1834) - a Swiss painter and engraver
 Franck Dumoulin (b. 1973) - a French pistol shooter 
 Gabriel Dumoulin (b. 1975) - a French comic book author
  (1877–1963) - a French politician 
  (b. 1934) - a French director
  (b. 1924) - a French science fiction writer
 Maxime Dumoulin (1893–1972) - a French composer
 Marcel Dumoulin (1905–1981) - a French weightlifter 
  (b. 1985) - a Canadian ice hockey player
  - a French historian
 Pierre Du Moulin (1568–1658) - a French theologian, a minister of the Huguenot church in Paris and Charenton
  (1749–1809) - a French general
  (1883–1944) - a Belgian painter and engraver 
 Samuel Dumoulin (b. 1980) - a French road bicycle racer 
 Tom Dumoulin (b. 1990) - a Dutch road bicycle racer

French-language surnames